The Demolition of Dhul-Khalasa occurred in April and May 632 CE, in 10 AH of the Islamic calendar. Sources refer to Dhul-Khalasa,, as both a cult image and as a temple, venerated by some Arabian tribes. Muhammad sent the companion Jarir ibn ʿAbdullah al-Bajali, to destroy the image, leaving in ruin the shrine surrounding it.  The cult image was of white stone or quartz, in the form of a pillar, column, or phallic symbol, the top of which was embroidered with a stone crown.

Background

In the early 7th century, the worship of Dhul-Khalasa was popular in some regions of Arabia. Its principal sanctuary was the famous al-Ka'bah al-Yamaniyah (the 'Yemenite Ka'ba'), rivaling that of Mecca, and located in the Asir region, south of Mecca.

The Temple of Dhul-Khalasa resided at Tabala, and was worshiped by the Bajila and Khath'am tribes. Pre-Islamic poetry also gives the cult object the name "the White Quartz Idol of Tabalah", a thing sworn by in oath form. According to Hisham Ibn Al-Kalbi, the remains of the shrine of Dhul-Khalasa now constitutes the threshold of the gate of the mosque at Tabalah.

The term Dhul-Khalasa is usually taken to be the name of the temple, as it was referred to as the Yemenite Ka’ba by the tribes who worshiped it. Old accounts say that it was the name of a god who was specifically worshiped there as well. It was reportedly worshiped under the name "God of Redemption" as the pure white stone symbolized purity, seen as absolving or absorbing the sins of its devotees. The name Dhul-Khalasa itself means having or possessing purity, or the ability to purify, free, to be clearing, rescuing.

From classical sources there is also an association with divination as well as fertility. Hisham Ibn Al-Kalbi quotes from a certain man: “O Dhul-Khalasa, were the one wronged, your father the one murdered and buried, you would not have forbidden the killing of the
enemy.” This incident is usually ascribed to Imru' al-Qais, when shuffling divination arrows before the idol, gave negative results for pursuing the vengeance of his father's death.

 records the following in a report about the signs of the end-times: "Abu Hurairah said, I heard the Prophet say, The Hour will not come until the buttocks of the women of Daws are set in motion while going around Dhul-Khalasa. Dhul-Khalasa was an idol worshiped by the tribe of Daws during the Jahiliyyah." 

Some commentators take this simply to mean the women will return to circumambulating around the idol, as the rump is naturally set in motion by walking around. Other commentators have interpreted this to mean hips, pelvises, even flanks and stomach sides of the women, and the motion as shaking, shimmying, quivering, all euphemistic of dancing. The connections between erotic or belly dancing and the phallic-nature of the symbol have been potentially suggestive of a fertility aspect to the cult as well.

Alleged claim of Survival
According to Wahhabi claims, even after the cult image was destroyed by Muslims, the worshipers of Dhul-Khalasa  resurrected its cult. Its worship allegedly continued in the region until 1815, when members of the Sunni Wahhabi movement organized military campaigns to suppress remnants of pagan worship. The reconstructed cult image was subsequently destroyed by gunfire.

Military campaign
After the spread of Islam, Muhammad sent a party of his followers to destroy the cult image of Dhul-Khalasa which stood there. Namely the companion Jarir ibn `Abdullah al-Bajali, with the aid of the Banu Ahmas, a horse-riding sub-branch of the Bajali tribe, were sent to demolish it.

The traditional narrative follows that the Prophet had inquired of Jarir what the condition of his tribe was. He gave the good news to the Prophet, "O Messenger of Allah! Almighty Allah made Islam superior. Adhans are called in the mosques and areas of Sons of Bajila. The tribes demolished the idols they  worshiped."

Muhammad was pleased to hear the report, but asked, "What had happened to Dhul-Khalasa?" When Jarir told him that it remained as it was, the Messenger of Allah was saddened. "By Allah! I will be rid of it too. O Jarir! Can you not save me from it? Can you not relieve me?", to which Jarir readily made preparations for an expedition.

According to Sahih Bukhari, Jarir rode with 150 horsemen to Dhul-Khalasa to destroy the "Yemenite Ka’ba".

Hisham Ibn Al-Kalbi mentions when Jarir ibn Abdullah proceeded to Dhul-Khalasa, he was met with resistance. The Muslims led by him, fought and overcame 100 men "of the Bajilah, its custodians, and many of the Khath'am" and another 200 men of the "Banu-Qubafah" tribes. Having defeated them and forced them into flight, he then demolished the building which stood over Dhul-Khalasa and set it on fire.

Islamic primary sources

The Muslim historian Hisham Ibn Al-Kalbi, mentions this event as follows:

The incident is also referenced in the Sahih Bukhari hadith collection:

See also
 Al-Uzza#Destruction of temple
List of expeditions of Muhammad

References

Campaigns ordered by Muhammad
632
630s conflicts
Arabian gods
Oracular gods
Destroyed temples
Persecution of Pagans
Persecution by Muslims